The Khartoum League began in 1952 and was a famous historical regional championship in Sudan. The teams playing in it were those from the three cities of the capital Khartoum; Khartoum, Bahri, and Omdurman.

The most famous winners of the Khartoum league were the two traditionally strong teams from Sudan, Al-Merrikh and Al-Hilal. They won the championship 17 and 16 times respectively before their eventual withdrawal in 1997. No team had exceeded the number of tiles of Al-Merreikh even though the club has not taken part in the competition since early 1997.

Championship history
1- 1951: Al-Tahrir SC (Bahri)
2- 1952: Al-Hilal Club
3- 1953: Al-Merrikh  SC
4- 1954: Al-Hilal Club
5- 1955: Al-Merrikh SC
- 1956: No Championship 
6- 1957: Al-Hilal Club
7- 1958: Al-Hilal Club
8- 1959: Al-Hilal Club
9- 1960: Al-Hilal Club
10- 1961: Al-Merrikh SC
11- 1962: Al-Hilal Club
12- 1963: Al Neel SC (Khartoum)
13- 1964: Al-Hilal Club
14- 1965: Al-Merrikh SC
15- 1966: Al-Hilal Club
16- 1967: Al-Merrikh SC
17- 1968: Al-Hilal Club
- 1969: No Championship 
18- 1970: Al-Hilal Club
19- 1971: Al-Merrikh SC
20- 1972: Al-Hilal Club
- 1973: No Championship 
21- 1974: Al-Merrikh SC
- 1975: No Championship 
- 1976: No Championship 
- 1977: No Championship 
22- 1978: Al-Mourada SC
23- 1979: Al-Merrikh SC
24- 1980: Al-Merrikh SC
25- 1981: Al-Hilal Club
26- 1982: Al-Merrikh SC
27- 1983: Al-Hilal Club
28- 1984: Al-Merrikh SC
29- 1985: Al-Merrikh SC
- 1986: No Championship 
- 1987: No Championship 
- 1988: No Championship 
30- 1989: Al-Hilal Club
31- 1990: Al-Merrikh SC
32- 1991: Al-Merrikh SC
33- 1992: Al-Merrikh SC
34- 1993: Al-Hilal Club
35- 1994: Al-Mourada SC
36- 1995: Al-Merrikh SC
37- 1996: Al-Merrikh SC
38- 1997: Shambat SC
39- 1998: Burri SC
- 2020-21: Al-Zoma SC

Football leagues in Sudan